The Christmas Album was the fourteenth album by The Manhattan Transfer, released in 1992 on Columbia Records.

This album was produced by Tim Hauser and Johnny Mandel and features a guest appearance by Tony Bennett on "The Christmas Song". The album also includes "Good Night", the only Beatles song the Manhattan Transfer has recorded.

Production
The album production lasted about three months. The album's original track is "A Christmas Love Song".

Track listing
 "Snowfall" (Claude Thornhill, Ruth Thornhill) - 5:35
 "Let It Snow! Let It Snow! Let It Snow!" (Jule Styne, Sammy Cahn) - 4:34
 "Santa Claus Is Coming to Town/Santa Man" (Medley) (J Fred Coots, Haven Gillespie, Alan Paul) - 3:02
 "The Christmas Song (Chestnuts Roasting on an Open Fire)" (Mel Tormé, Robert Wells) - 4:40
 "Silent Night, Holy Night" (Franz Gruber, Joseph Mohr) - 5:55
 "Caroling, Caroling" (Alfred Burt, Wilha Hutson) - 1:24
 "Happy Holiday/The Holiday Season" (Medley) (Irving Berlin, Kay Thompson) - 4:06
 "A Christmas Love Song" (Johnny Mandel, Alan Bergman, Marilyn Bergman) - 4:08
 "It Came Upon The Midnight Clear" (Edmund Sears, Richard Storrs Willis) - 5:55
 "Have Yourself a Merry Little Christmas" (Hugh Martin, Ralph Blane) - 4:39
 "Good Night" (John Lennon, Paul McCartney) - 3:50

Credits 

The Manhattan Transfer
 Cheryl Bentyne – vocals, vocal arrangements (10)
 Tim Hauser – vocals 
 Alan Paul – vocals, vocal arrangements (3)
 Janis Siegel – vocals, vocal arrangements (2)

Musicians 
Rhythm Section and Soloists
 Randy Kerber – keyboards
 Ian Underwood – keyboards
 Yaron Gershovsky – acoustic piano solo (3)
 John Pisano – guitars
 Chuck Domanico – rhythm bass 
 Ralph Humphrey – drums 
 Sol Gubin – drums, percussion 
 Larry Bunker – percussion
 Daniel Greco – percussion
 Pete Christlieb – tenor sax solo (7)
 Jack Sheldon – trumpet solo (2)
 Harry Edison – trumpet solo (7)

Brass and Strings
 Eddie Karam – orchestra conductor
 Jules Chaikin – orchestra contractor 
 Gerald Vinci – concertmaster 
 Suzie Katayama – music supervisor 
 Jeff DeRosa, Marni Johnson, Richard  Todd and Brad Warnaar – French horn 
 Pete Christlieb, Jon Clarke, Bob Cooper, Gary Foster, Steve Kujala, Ronnie Lang, Dick Mitchell, Jack Nimitz,  Marshall Royal, Don Shelton, Bob Tricarico and Jim Walker – reeds, saxophone
 George Bohanon, Charles Loper, Dick Nash, Bill Reichenbach Jr. and Chauncey Welsch – trombone 
 Rick Baptist, Oscar Brashear, Charles Davis, Harry Edison, Chuck Findley, Warren Luening and Bobby Shew – trumpet 
 Anne Atkinson, Art Davis, Buell Neidlinger, Jim Hughart and Margaret Storer – bass
 Larry Corbett, Ernie Ehrhardt, Igor Horoshevsky, Anne Karam, Suzie Katayama, Ray Kelley, Fred Seykora and David Shamban – cello
 Gayle Levant, Carol Robbins and Amy Shulman – harp
 Marilyn Baker, Sam Boghossian, Ken Burward-Hoy, Peter Hatch, Roland Kato, Linda Lipsett, Margot MacLaine, Michael Nowak and Herschel Wise – viola 
 Arnold Belnick, Ron Clark, Isabelle Daskoff, Joel Derouin, Assa Drori, Henry Ferber, Joe Goodman, Diana Halprin, Peter Kent, Brian Leonard, Gordon Marron, Don Palmer, Debra Price, Marc Sazer, Bob Sushel, Haim Shtrum, Mary Tsumura, Gerald Vinci, Lissy Wilson, John Wittenberg, Leslie Woodbury and Shari Zippert – violin

Guest Vocalists
 Tony Bennett – vocals (4)
 Joseph Bwarie, Jason Kaleb Henley, Quincy McCrary, Nicolas Nackley, Bobbi Page, Jonathan Redford, Marc Schillinger, Jeffrey Smith, Marc Smollin, Sally Stevens, Susan Stevens and Josh Weiner – children's choir (5, 9)
 Sally Stevens – choir director (5, 9)
 Basie Hauser, Arielle Paul and Keely Pickering – children vocals (11)

Arrangements
 Johnny Mandel – orchestral arrangements, vocal arrangements (1, 5, 7, 8, 11)
 Gene Puerling – vocal arrangements (1, 4)
 Brin Bethel – vocal arrangements (6)
 Jimmy Joyce – vocal arrangements (6)
 Jack Schrader – additional music arrangements (9)
 Corey Allen – vocal arrangements (10)

Production 
 Tim Hauser – producer 
 Johnny Mandel – producer, liner notes 
 Robin Urdang – executive producer
 Al Schmitt – orchestra recording 
 Dave Reitzas – vocal recording
 Keith Kresgy – additional engineer, assistant engineer 
 Eric Rudd – assistant engineer
 Hank Cicalo – mixing 
 Bernie Grundman – mastering
 Jay Landers – A&R
 Ivy Skoff – production coordinator
 Tom Gibson – product manager 
 Nancy Donald – art direction, design  
 Diego Uchitel – photography
Studios
 Recorded at Ocean Way Recording and Devonshire Sound Studios (Hollywood, California).
 Mixed at Bill Schnee Studios (North Hollywood, California).
 Mastered at Bernie Grundman Mastering (Hollywood, California).
Notes
Ⓟ 1992 Sony Music Entertainment Inc. © 1992 Sony Music Entertainment Inc.

References

The Manhattan Transfer albums
1992 Christmas albums
Christmas albums by American artists
Columbia Records Christmas albums